Heaton Park is a tram stop at Heaton Park in the town of Prestwich, Greater Manchester, England. It is on the Bury Line of Greater Manchester's light rail Metrolink system. It is part of Ticketing Zone 3, and is at the corner of Whittaker Lane and Bury Old Road, with an entrance to Heaton Park.

Services
Services run every 12 minutes on two routes, forming a 6-minute service between Bury and Manchester at peak times.

Connecting bus routes

Go North West's 135 service calls outside the station towards Bury and Manchester. Tyrers Coaches run the 94 service between Bury and North Manchester General Hospital via Pilsworth Asda and Polefield. Arriva service 484 ran from Prestwich village to Kersal, Pendlebury, Swinton, Monton and Eccles, Until late 2020. Diamond also runs the 66 service that runs to Eccles from Prestwich Hospital.

Gallery

References

External links

Heaton Park Stop Information
Heaton Park area map

Tram stops in the Metropolitan Borough of Bury
Former Lancashire and Yorkshire Railway stations
Railway stations in Great Britain opened in 1879
Railway stations in Great Britain closed in 1991
Railway stations in Great Britain opened in 1992
Tram stops on the Altrincham to Bury line
Tram stops on the Bury to Ashton-under-Lyne line
Prestwich